Heinrich Sturm (12 June 1920 – 22 December 1944) was a German Luftwaffe military aviator during World War II, a fighter ace credited with 158 enemy aircraft shot down in an unknown number of combat missions. All of his aerial victories were claimed over the Eastern Front.

Born in Dieburg, Sturm joined the military service in the Luftwaffe of Nazi Germany and was trained as a fighter pilot. He was then posted to Jagdgeschwader 52 (JG 52—52nd Fighter Wing) in the summer 1941. JG 52 was based on the central sector of the Eastern Front, where he claimed his first aerial victory on 16 October 1941. In September 1943, he was appointed Staffelkapitän (squadron leader) of the 4. Staffel (4th squadron) of JG 52. Sturm was awarded the Knight's Cross of the Iron Cross on 26 March 1944 and severely wounded by bomb shrapnel on 16 April. Following his convalescence, he returned to JG 52, taking command of 5. Staffel. Sturm was killed in a takeoff accident on 22 December 1944 in Csór, Hungary.

Career
Sturm was born on 12 June 1920 in Dieburg in the Province of Hesse-Nassau as part of the Weimar Republic. Following fighter pilot training, he was posted to 6. Staffel (6th squadron) of Jagdgeschwader 52 (JG 52—52nd fighter wing) with the rank of Feldwebel (Sergeant) in the summer of 1941. At the time, JG 52 was based on the Eastern Front, supporting Operation Barbarossa, the German invasion of the Soviet Union. His commanding officer in 6. Staffel was Oberleutnant Rudolf Resch, a squadron subordinated to II. Gruppe (2nd group) of JG 52 headed by Hauptmann Erich Woitke.

On 2 October, German forces launched Operation Typhoon, the failed strategic offensive to capture Moscow. In support of this offensive, the Gruppe had moved to an airfield west of Kalinin, present-day Tver, on 16 October. Two days later, Sturm claimed his first three aerial victory when he shot down a Petlyakov Pe-2 bomber. Sturm then returned to Germany, where he served as an instructor at a fighter pilot school and attended the Kriegsschule.

Eastern Front
Following his return to the Eastern Front, he was assigned to the Gruppenstab (headquarters unit) II. Gruppe of JG 52. On 1 January 1943, he was promoted to Leutnant (second lieutenant). Sturm claimed his first aerial victory with the Gruppenstab, and tenth in total, on 13 February when he shot down a Lavochkin-Gorbunov-Gudkov LaGG-3 fighter south of Novorossiysk. At the time, II. Gruppe was based at Slavyansk-na-Kubani and fighting over the Kuban bridgehead following the German defeat in the Battle of Stalingrad. The commanding officer of II. Gruppe was Hauptmann Johannes Steinhoff. On 13 March, the Gruppe moved to an airfield at Anapa where it remained until 5 July. On 24 March, Steinhoff left the Gruppe and was replaced by Hauptmann Helmut Kühle.

Sturm claimed three LaGG-3 fighters shot down on 15 April near Abinskaya, taking his total to 22 aerial victories. Five days later he became an "ace-in-a-day" for the first time, bringing his total to 30. That day, he shot down a Lavochkin La-5 fighter on mission before noon, and three Ilyushin Il-2 ground attack aircraft and a further La-5 fighter near Gelendzhik in the afternoon. He reached his 40th aerial victory on 6 June when he shot down two La-5 fighters. On 23 July, Sturm was awarded the German Cross in Gold.

Squadron leader and death

On 1 August 1943, Sturm was appointed acting Staffelkapitän (squadron leader) of 4. Staffel (4th squadron) of JG 52. He replaced Leutnant Helmut Lipfert in this capacity who was transferred to the 6. Staffel (4th squadron) of JG 52. Sturm later officially became the Staffelkapitän of 4. Staffel on 1 September, succeeding Hauptmann Gerhard Barkhorn who was given command of II. Gruppe. That day, the Gruppe moved to an airfield at Karlivka where they fought in the aftermath of the Belgorod–Kharkov offensive operation, also referred to as the fourth Battle of Kharkov. Here, Sturm claimed his first aerial victory as Staffelkapitän when he shot down a La-5 fighter. In November, the Red Army launched the Kerch–Eltigen operation leading to the Crimean offensive in early 1944. On 2 November, II. Gruppe was moved to Baherove where elements of the Gruppe remained until 19 March 1944. On 5 November, Sturm again became an "ace-in-a-day" when he shot down an Il-2 ground attack aircraft and five Yakovlev Yak-1 fighters over the Soviet bridge heads. The following day, he claimed six further victories, five Yak-1 fighters and a Bell P-39 Airacobra, making him yet again an "ace-in-a-day".

On 13 December, Sturm claimed his last aerial victory of 1943 when he shot down a Curtiss P-40 Warhawk fighter east of Eltingen, present-day part of Kerch. On 28 February 1944, 4. and 5. Staffel was ordered to Grammatikowo located near Sovietskyi. Sturm was awarded the Knight's Cross of the Iron Cross on 26 March 1944. On 8 April, Sturm claimed eight aerial victories, including 100th in total, his last "ace-in-a-day" achievement. He was the 66th Luftwaffe pilot to achieve the century mark. A few weeks later on 16 April, he was wounded badly by bomb debris in an attack on the airfield at Chersonesus at Sevastopol on the Crimea. In consequence, command of 4. Staffel was passed on to Leutnant Hans Waldmann.

In August 1944, he returned to JG 52 and took over command of 5. Staffel (5th squadron) on 1 September. He replaced Otto Fönnekold, who was killed in action on 31 August. On 22 December 1944, he claimed his last two aerial victories. Taking off for another sortie from Csór that day, one of his Bf 109 G-6/U4 (Werknummer 442036—factory number) aircraft's landing gear struts hit a truck, killing him in the accident. The following day, command of 5. Staffel was given to Leutnant Peter Düttmann.

Summary of career

Aerial victory claims
According to US historian David T. Zabecki, Sturm was credited with 158 aerial victories. Spick lists Sturm with 157 aerial victories claimed in an unknown number of combat missions, all of them on the Eastern Front. Mathews and Foreman, authors of Luftwaffe Aces — Biographies and Victory Claims, researched the German Federal Archives and state that he is attributed with 158 aerial victories, all of which claimed on the Eastern Front. The archives revealed records for 123 of these claims. However, there are 52 additional claims attributed to II. Gruppe of JG 52 in the timeframe November to December 1944 that have no names associated to them. The authors assume that many of these claims belong to Sturm.

Victory claims were logged to a map-reference (PQ = Planquadrat), for example "PQ 19424". These sectors were then subdivided into 36 smaller units to give a location area 3 × 4 km in size.

Awards
 Honour Goblet of the Luftwaffe on 26 July 1943 as Leutnant and pilot
 German Cross in Gold on 23 July 1943 as Leutnant in the Stab/Jagdgeschwader 52
 Knight's Cross of the Iron Cross on 26 March 1944 as Leutnant (war officer) and Staffelführer of the 4./Jagdgeschwader 52

Notes

References

Citations

Bibliography

 
 
 
 
 
 
 
 
 
 
 
 
 
 
 
 
 

1920 births
1944 deaths
Luftwaffe pilots
German World War II flying aces
Recipients of the Gold German Cross
Recipients of the Knight's Cross of the Iron Cross
Aviators killed in aviation accidents or incidents
Victims of aviation accidents or incidents in Hungary
People from Dieburg
Military personnel from Hesse